The Jingpo people are an ethnic group who are the largest subset of the Kachin peoples, which largely inhabit the Kachin Hills in northern Myanmar's Kachin State and neighbouring Dehong Dai and Jingpo Autonomous Prefecture of China. There is also a significant Jingpo community in northeastern India's Arunachal Pradesh and Assam, as well as in Taiwan. While they mostly live in Myanmar, the Kachin are called the Jingpo in China and Singpho in Indiathe terms are considered synonymous. The greater name for all the Kachin peoples in their own Jingpo language is the Jinghpaw. Other endonyms include Tsaiva, Lechi, Theinbaw, Singfo, Chingpaw
 
The Kachin people are an ethnic affinity of several tribal groups, known for their fierce independence, disciplined fighting skills, complex clan inter-relations, craftsmanship, herbal healing and jungle survival skills. Other neighbouring residents of Kachin State include the Shans (Thai/Lao related), the Lisus, the Rawangs, the Nagas, and the Bamar, the latter forming the largest ethnic group in Burma. In China, the Jingpo form one of the 55 ethnic minorities, where they numbered 147,828 people in the 2010 census.

Scope
There are three different definitions of Jingpo people. The Jinghpo ethnic group refers to those who speak Jingpo as their sole mother tongue and is adopted by the Burmese government as one of the 135 officially recognized ethnic groups in Myanmar. The Jingpo Nation or Jinghpo Pongyong includes all speakers of Zaiwa cluster of Northern Burmish languages, who also speak Jingpo as their secondary language. This definition is adopted by the Chinese government as one of the 56 officially recognized nations of China. The Jingpo Confederation or Jinghpo Wunpong emerged in twentieth century includes also those living in Kachin Hills but previously interacted with Jingpo speakers to a limited scope. This definition is adopted the Burmese government as one of the 8 "major national ethnic races" of Myanmar.

In Myanmar 
The Kachins claim that the term Kachin is not from their language. Therefore, many of the Kachins only want to use the term "Jinghpaw Wunpawng" to mean all the Kachins ethnics while "Jinghpaw" is also used not only to mean one of the Kachin tribe "Jinghpaw", but also to include all the Kachins. 
Two different categorisation schemes complicate the terms Jingpo and Kachin, which also operate as political geography terms of British origin.

In one form of categorisation, a variety of different linguistic groups with overlapping territories and integrated social structures are described as a single people: the Jingpo or Kachin. In another form of categorisation, the native speakers of each language in the area are treated as distinct ethnic groups. Both schemes treat the Shan people who live in the same or contiguous areas as ethnically distinct. Jingpo people have frequently defied the Western expectation of lineage-based ethnicity by culturally "becoming Shans" (Leach 1965).

Just recently the Burmese Government announced to make family records of all the citizens by categorising each people who speak different dialects. As a result, many ethnics become confused what to choose to be named on their IDs. So are the Kachins. Kachins are divided and fighting over the name Kachin or Jinghpaw Wunpawng even though there are clear and vivid evidence that they all are from the same background with the closest identities. Despite the fact that all syntax, grammar, phonology, morphology, schools of thought, traditions, culture are all the same, while pronunciation, spellings, alphabets differ (which is nature for different tribes from the same ethnic), Kachins are divided and debating on the term Kachin and Jinghpaw Wunpawng.

Jingpo

Jingpo proper (spelled Jinghpaw in Jinghpaw) is spoken by 1,500,000 people in Burma and by 150,000 people in China. It is classified as Sino-Tibetan, Tibeto-Burman, Kachin–Luic. Jingpo proper is also understood by many speakers of Zaiwa. The standard Jingpo language taught in China is based on the dialect of Enkun (in Yingjiang – west-northwest part of Dehong Prefecture).

There are around 100–200 Jingpo people who live in Taiwan: they can be found in Taipei, Kaohsiung, Pingtung, Taitung, and other cities. They are the descendants of 52 tribespeople who were members of the Yunnan People's Anti-Communist Volunteer Army who fled to Taiwan after the defeat of the Kuomintang in Mainland China. Every October, they host performances where they dance in traditional costumes. There is also a "Jingpo Taiwanese Friendship Association".

Zaiwa

Zaiwa (also spelled Tsaiwa; called Atsi in Jingpo proper, Zǎiwǎyǔ (载瓦语) in Chinese, and Zi in Burmese) is spoken by approximately 80,000 people in China and 30,000 people in Burma. It is classified as Sino-Tibetan, Tibeto-Burman, Yi-Burman, and Northern Burmic. After the establishment of the People's Republic of China, a written language based on the dialect of the village of Longzhun (in Xishan district in Luxi county) and using the Latin alphabet was created and officially introduced in 1957.

Religion
Jingpo folk religion worships various gods as well as the spirits of their ancestors. The ancestor of all the Jingpo, who is worshipped as a spirit or god, is held to be named Madai. Jingpo Animists believe that spirits reside everywhere, from the sun to the animals, and that these spirits bring good or bad luck. For the Jingpo, all living creatures are believed to have souls. Rituals are carried out for protection in almost all daily activities, from planting of crops to warfare.

The majority of Singphos in India follow Theravāda Buddhism. Christianity is also one of the religions among the Jingpo.

Culture
Traditional Jingpo dwellings are usually two stories and built out of wood and bamboo. The houses are of oval form; the first floor serves as a storage and stable while the second is utilised for living quarters. Women often dress in black jackets with silver decorations. They also wear wool skirts made in bright colours. The men often wear white and black pants, covering their heads with turbans: the youths with white turbans and the adults with black turbans.

History
The Jingpo ancestors lived on the Tibetan plateau and migrated gradually towards the south. At their arrival to the present province of Yunnan, the Jingpo were referred to as Xunchuanman. The Jingpo are likely related to the neighbouring Qiang and Miao people.

The Jinghpo polity in  Upper Myanmar seems to be referred to as Cha-shan in the Chinese chronicle Ming Shilu. In the text, the polity is said to extend from Nmai River in today's Kachin state, Myanmar, to the east in Lu-shui county in Yunnan.

During the 15th and 16th centuries the Jingpo continued migrating to their present territory. During the 17th century, the Jinphos were involved in trade exchange between the Ahom kingdom and China in the form of ivory, copper and silver.  They have received diverse names along the centuries: Echang, Zhexie, and Yeren, the latter name which was used in China from the Yuan dynasty to the formation of the People's Republic of China in 1949. During the British colonial period, some tribes were well integrated into the state while others operated with a large degree of autonomy. Kachin people, including those organised as the Kachin Levies provided assistance to British units fighting the Japanese Imperial Army during World War II.

Following the end of World War II and Burma's independence from Britain, long standing ethnic conflicts between frontier peoples such as the Kachin people and the Burman-dominated central government resurfaced. The first uprising occurred in 1949. The uprisings escalated following the declaration of Buddhism (which is not practised by the Kachin people) as a national religion in 1961. However, Kachin people fought both for and against the government during most of the ethnic conflicts. Kachin soldiers once formed a core part of the Burmese armed forces and many stayed loyal after the Kachin Independence Organisation (KIO) with its military wing, the Kachin Independent Army (KIA) was formed in 1961. After Ne Win's coup in 1962, there were fewer opportunities in the Burma Army for Kachin people. Much of Kachin State outside of the cities and larger towns was for many years KIO administered.

The KIO formed alliances with other ethnic groups resisting the Burmese occupation, and later despite its non-communist stance along with China informally supported the Communist Party of Burma (CPB), which held strategically sensitive parts of the country vis à vis the Kachin positions. The KIO continued to fight when Ne Win's dictatorship was succeeded by another incarnation of the military junta in 1988 called the State Law and Order Restoration Council (SLORC). However, with a gradual withdrawal of Chinese support, in 1989 the Communist Party of Burma soon disintegrated into warlord led groups that negotiated ceasefire deals with the junta. This led to the KIO being surrounded by organisations effectively aligned with the SPDC. It was squeezed by redeployed battalions of the rearmed and ever growing Burma Army, and constantly urged to make peace by a civilian population suffering from years of warfare. In 1994 the KIO chose to enter into a ceasefire with the junta.

The ceasefire delivered neither security nor prosperity to the Kachin. With the end of hostilities the Burma Army presence has increased considerably, along with allegations of atrocities against the civilian population, including forced labour and rape.

High demand from China is currently encouraging logging-based deforestation in the Kachin region of Burma.  Increasingly impoverished, some Jingpo women and children are drawn into the sex trade in Thailand, China and Yangon (KWAT 2005).

Migration
The Jinghpaws, or The Jinghpaw Wunpawngs, have been forced to migrate to Malaysia and Thailand. The civil war between KIA and the Burmese Army caused Kachins to leave their motherland and seek asylum in Thailand and Malaysia. Since both Thailand nor Malaysia are not signatories to the 1951 Geneva Refugee Convention, these two countries are just a second place for the Kachin refugees and they have to go to third countries such as the USA, Australia, Canada, New Zealand, and other EU countries through UNHCR's resettlement program. Since there are too many refugees in Malaysia to process their resettlement process, refugees normally have to wait for five to seven years to be resettled. Most of the Kachin refugees are in IDP camps and some are in Malaysia.

Singpho people

The Singpho is the name for the Jingpo in India. They live in the state of Arunachal Pradesh in the district of Lohit and Changlang and in Assam inhabits in the district of Tinsukia and scattered in some other district like Sivasagar, Jorhat and Golaghat. Comprising a population of at least 7,900 in India, they live in the villages, namely Bordumsa, Miao, Innao, N-hpum, Namgo, Ketetong, Pangna, Phup, N-htem, Mungong, Kumchai, Pangsun, Hasak, Katha, Bisa, Dibong, Duwarmara, Namo and Namsai, etc. They speak the Singpho dialect of the Jingpo language. They have the status of Scheduled Tribe.

The Singphos are divided into a number of clans, known as Gams, each under a chief. The principal Gams include the Bessa, Duffa, Luttao, Luttora, Tesari, Mirip, Lophae, Lutong and Magrong. The Singpho are also divided into four classes, namely Shangai, Myung, Lubrung and Mirip.

Religion 
While the Singphos in India are predominantly Theravāda Buddhists, the Jinghpaws in Kachin, Myanmar is 99% Christian. Before the arrival of Buddhism, animism was widely followed; in this community in India, all the ancestors of the Singpho or Jinghpaws worshiped spirits or gods, such as a well-known spirit named Madai. Singpho Animists believe that spirits reside everywhere, from the sun to the animals, and that these spirits bring good or bad luck. For the Singpho, all living creatures are believed to have souls. Rituals are carried out for protection in almost all daily activities, from the planting of crops to warfare.

Lifestyle 
Unlike most hill-people, shifting cultivation (jhum) is not as widely practiced, although tea is widely planted. When British attempts to introduce Chinese tea plants for cultivation in Assam were unsuccessful, they discovered that the Singpho people cultivated tea. By hybridizing the Singpho and Chinese strains, and using Chinese tea cultivation techniques, the basis for large-scale tea cultivation in Assam was laid. The Singpho produce their tea by plucking the tender leaves and drying them in the sun and exposing them to the night dew for three days and nights. The leaves are then placed in the hollow tube of bamboo, and the cylinder will be exposed to the smoke of the fire. In this way, their tea can be kept for years without losing its flavor. The Singpho also depended on yams and other edible tubers as their staple food.

They are the earliest people to have used tea in India, but there is no substantial documentation of the history of tea drinking in the Indian subcontinent for the pre-colonial period. One can only speculate that tea leaves were widely used in ancient India since the plant is native to some parts of India. The Singpho tribe and the Khamti tribe, inhabitants of the regions where the Camellia sinensis plant grew native, have been consuming tea since the 12th century. It is also possible that tea may have been used under another name. Frederick R. Dannaway, in the essay "Tea As Soma", argues that tea was perhaps better known as "Soma" in Indian mythology.

Dress 
The Singpho made shields from buffalo hide, many of them can be as long as four feet. They also have helmets are made from either buffalo hide or rattan-work, and vanished black and decorated with the boar's tusks. Most men tie their hair in a large knot on the crown of the head. The women dress their hair gathered into a broad knot on the crown of the head, fastening it by silver bodkins, chains and tassels, which is similar to the architecture of the modern skyscrapers. The maidens tie their tresses into a roll and keep it tied just above the nape.
Singpho dwellings are usually two stories and built out of wood and bamboo. The houses are of oval form; the first floor serves as a storage and stable while the second is utilized for living quarters. Women often dress in black jackets with silver decorations during festival known as Munao Poi. This dress are one of the most beautiful and attractive dress in Northeast India. They also wear wool skirts made in bright red colors. The men often wear a white shirt with colorful Lungi, covering their heads with turbans.

Notes

References

Sources
 
 
 E. R. Leach, Political Systems of Highland Burma: A Study of Kachin Social Structure (Boston: Beacon, 1965 [1954]).
 Kachin Women's Association Thailand (KWAT), Driven Away: Trafficking of Kachin women on the China-Burma border (Chiang Mai, Thailand, 2005).
 Fredrich Kahrl, Horst Weyerhaeuser, and Su Yufang, Navigating the Border: An Analysis of the China–Myanmar Timber Trade . Forest Trends, World Agroforestry Centre, 2004.
 Global Witness A Choice for China: Ending the destruction of Burma's frontier forests, 2005.
 Liú Lù, Jǐngpōzú yǔyán jiǎnzhì – Jǐngpōyǔ 刘璐景颇族语言简志——景颇语 (Introduction to a language of the Jingpo nationality – Jingpo; Běijīng 北京, Mínzú chūbǎnshè 民族出版社 1984).
 Xú Xījiān 徐悉艰, Xú Guìzhēn 徐桂珍, Jǐngpōzú yǔyán jiǎnzhì – Zǎiwǎyǔ 景颇族语言简志——载瓦语 (Introduction to a language of the Jingpo nationality – Tsaiva; Běijīng 北京, Mínzú chūbǎnshè 民族出版社 1984).
 All Kachin Students and Youth Union (AKSYU), Kachin Development Networking Group(KDNG), Valley of Darkness; 2007
 Valley of Darkness: Gold Mining and Militarization in Burma's Hugawng Valley (Chiang Mai, Thailand, 2007)
 Bradley, David. (1997). Tibeto-Burman languages of the Himalayas. Canberra: Australian National University Press. ; OCLC 37646449
 Prandey, B. B. Pandey and D. K. Duarah. (1991). Myths and Beliefs on Creation of Universe Among the Tribes of Arunachal Pradesh. Itanagar, Arunāchal Pradesh (India): Directorate of Research, Government of Arunachal Pradesh. ; OCLC 50424420

External links

 Kachin National Organisation
 Jinghpaw Land “Jingpo Dadi”
 The Jingpo ethnic minority (Chinese government site)
 Jingphaw/Kachin 
 The Kachin Post
 Kachin Radio
 KIO News in English
 Information on the Kachins with a short introduction to the language
 News in Jingphaw and Burmese
 Kachin Bible
 All Kachin Students & Youth Union (AKSYU)
 Kachin National Organization
 The Kachin of Burma
 Singpho: Victims of India
 Art and crafts of the Singpho
 Ethnologue profile
 Christianity Overwhelming Buddhism in India's North-East

 
Ethnic groups in Myanmar
Ethnic groups officially recognized by China
Refugees in Malaysia
Tribes of Arunachal Pradesh
Tribes of Assam
Social groups of Assam
Ethnic groups in Northeast India
Ethnic groups in South Asia